Hochdorf District was one of the five Ämtern, or districts, of the German-speaking Canton of Lucerne, Switzerland. Its capital is the town of Hochdorf. In 2013 the name was changed from Amt Hochdorf to Wahlkreis Hochdorf as part of a reorganization of the Canton. A sixth Wahlkreis was created, but in Hochdorf everything else remained essentially unchanged.

Hochdorf District consists of the following thirteen municipalities:

Mergers
On 1 January 2021 the former municipality of Altwis merged into the municipality of Hitzkirch.

References

External links
 

Districts of the canton of Lucerne